{{Automatic taxobox
|image = Dioclea lasiophylla Mart. ex Benth. (2360939095).jpg
|image_caption = Dioclea lasiophylla
|taxon = Dioclea
|authority = Kunth
|subdivision_ranks = Species
|subdivision = See text.
|synonyms = *Crepidotropis Walp.Hymenospron Spreng.Lepidamphora Zoll. ex Miq.
|synonyms_ref = 
}}Dioclea is a genus of flowering plants in the pea family, Fabaceae, that is native to the Americas. The seeds of these legumes are buoyant drift seeds, and are dispersed by rivers.

Taxonomy
A molecular phylogenetic study published in 2020 showed that when broadly circumscribed, Dioclea was not monophyletic. Many species were transferred to the genus Macropsychanthus.

 Species
, Plants of the World Online accepted the following species:Dioclea albiflora R.S.CowanDioclea apurensis KunthDioclea burkartii R.H.MaxwellDioclea fimbriata HuberDioclea guianensis Benth.Dioclea holtiana Pittier ex R.H.MaxwellDioclea lasiophylla Mart. ex Benth.Dioclea lehmannii DielsDioclea macrantha HuberDioclea ovalis R.H.MaxwellDioclea paniculata Killip ex R.H.MaxwellDioclea sericea KunthDioclea vallensis R.H.MaxwellDioclea virgata (Rich.) Amshoff

Species transferred to Macropsychanthus include:
 Dioclea grandiflora → Macropsychanthus grandiflorus Dioclea macrocarpa → Macropsychanthus macrocarpus Dioclea schimpffii → Macropsychanthus schimpffii Chemistry 
The A-type proanthocyanidin, epigallocatechin-(2β→7,4β→8)-epicatechin, together with epicatechin, luteolin 3′β-d-glucopyranoside, chrysoeriol 7β-d-glucopyranoside and 2-methylpentan-2,4-diol, can be found in the leaves of Dioclea lasiophylla''.

References

Faboideae
Fabaceae genera